"Love Town" is a solo single co-written by Len Barry and Bobby Eli and released by the former Sweet Thunder and Impact member, Booker Newberry III in 1983. It was taken from the same-titled album released later that year.

While the single and album had limited success in his home country of the U.S., Newberry's single was popular enough across the Atlantic to reach #6 on the UK Singles Chart, his only significant chart hit in either country. It remains his signature song.

Chart performance

References

External links
[ Booker Newberry III biography at Allmusic]
Love Town (1983) all releases at Discogs.

1983 singles
Songs written by Bobby Eli
Songs written by Len Barry
1983 songs